Ride is an album by the band Godspeed, released in 1994 on the Atlantic Records label.

Track listing

References

External links

1994 debut albums